Zhōu is a Chinese-language surname. In places which use the Wade–Giles romanization such as Taiwan, Zhou is usually spelled as "Chou" (ㄓㄡ), and it may also be spelled as "Chiau", "Chau", "Chao", "Chew", "Chow", "Chiu", "Cho", "Chu", "Jhou", "Jou", "Djou", "Jue", "Jow", or "Joe". Zhou ranks as the 10th most common surname in Mainland China . In 2013 it was found to be the 10th most common name, shared by 25,200,000 people or 1.900% of the population, with the province with the most being Hunan. Derived from the Zhou dynasty, it has been one of the ten most common surnames in China since the Yuan dynasty. It is the 5th name on the Hundred Family Surnames poem. The Korean surname, "Joo" or "Ju", and The Vietnamese surname, "Châu" or "Chu", are both derived from and written with the same Chinese character (周). The character also means "around". Zhōu can also stand for another, rare Chinese family name, 洲.

History
According to historical records, Zhou surname originates from the imperial kinsmen of the Zhou dynasty. The original surname (xing) of the royal Zhou family was Ji (姬). In 256 B.C., the Qin dynasty conquered Zhou and put Rufen under the jurisdiction of Runan County. Ji Yong, a descendant of King Ping of Zhou, which lived on the system of enfeoffment in Rufen, changed his surname to Zhou to commemorate the merits and virtues of his ancestors. The descendants of Emperor Nan of the Zhou Dynasty, who were called the Zhou family after the Zhou Dynasty had been destroyed, also took on the Zhou surname. Since then the Zhou surname has become a common family name in Runan.

Non-Han people who adopted the name Zhou include the Helu and Pu surnames of the Xianbei nationality in (the Northern Zhou) and the Xitong and Shuhu surnames of the Mongolian nationality in the Yuan dynasty.

People with the Zhou surname could be found all over the country due to enfeoffment and migration through the ages, especially from out Runan. In general the migration of the Zhou family followed the pattern of "west to east" and "south to north".

Prominent individuals with the surname Zhou

Modern day

Bibi Zhou (born 1985), Chinese singer and actress
Charles Djou, Hawaii politician
Chou Tzu-yu (born 1999), Taiwanese singer, dancer, visual, and member of the South-Korean girl group Twice
Chou Wen-chung (1923–2019), composer, professor at Columbia University and founder of the Center for U.S.-China Arts Exchange
Chow Yun-fat, famous Hong Kong actor
Eric Chou, Taiwanese singer-songwriter
Alex Chow, Former Secretary-general of the Hong Kong Federation of Students
Francis Jue, actor
Hong Chau (born 1979), Vietnamese American actor
Jay Chou (Chou Chie Lun), Taiwanese musician, singer, songwriter and director
Jimmy Choo, Yeang Keat, world-famous Malaysian born London shoe designer
Kathy Chow, actress
Kelsey Chow, actor from Disney's Pair of Kings
Malese Jow, Chinese-American teen actress
Michael Chow Man-Kin, actor
Nancy Zhou, American violinist
Agnes Chow, Hong Kong student activist and politician
Natalie Chou (born 1997), American basketball player
Niki Chow, actress
Norm Chow, American football coach
Osric Chau, Canadian actor
Silas Chou, Hong Kong billionaire
Stephen Chow, famous Hong Kong actor and director
Steve Chou (Zhōu Chuánxióng), Taiwanese composer and singer.
Veronica Chou (born 1984/1985), Hong Kong businesswoman
Vic Zhou, actor, singer
Vivian Chow, singer
Wakin Chau (Emil Chau), musician, singer
Wei-Liang Chow, mathematician
Wen Tsing Chow, missile guidance scientist
William Kwai Sun Chow, Martial artist
Xiangyu Zhou (born 1965), Chinese mathematician
Chau Chin-fu (born 1952), Taiwanese judoka
Chau Hoi Wah (born 1986), female Hong Kong badminton player
Zhou Enlai (1898–1976), first Premier of the People's Republic of China
Zhou Fengsuo, human rights activist
Zhou Guangzhao, former president of Chinese Academy of Sciences, theoretical physicist 
Zhou Guanyu, (born 1999), Formula 1 driver
Zhou Haiyan (born 1990), Chinese female middle-distance runner
Zhou Jianren, politician, younger brother of Lu Xun
Zhou Jieqiong (born 1998), vocalist of the South-Korean girl group Pristin
Zhou Long, composer
Zhou Mi, Chinese female badminton player
Zhou Mi, Chinese pop male singer from the boy band Super Junior-M
Zhou Peiyuan, former president of Peking University, theoretical physicist
Zhou Qi, Chinese basketball player
Zhou Shen, singer
Zhou Shuren, writer using the pseudonym Lu Xun
Zhou Xiaochuan, economist
Zhou Xiaoping, writer, social commentator.
Zhou Xiaoyan (1917–2016), soprano and voice teacher
Zhou Xuan (1918–1957), actress
Zhou Xun, actress
Zhou Yanfei (born 1990), Paralympic swimmer sister of Zhou Ying (born 1989), also a paralympic swimmer.
Zhou Yahui, businessman, entrepreneur
Zhou Yi (disambiguation)
Zhou Yongkang (born 1942), member of the 17th CPC Politburo Standing Committee
Zhou Youguang (1906–2017), Chinese linguist and sinologist
Zhou Zuoren, writer, brother of Lu Xun
Zhou Zhennan, rapper, singer, songwriter and dancer
Chou Tien-chen, Taiwanese badminton player

Historical
Alphabetized by surname, then by given name.

Zhou Fang, military general of the state of Eastern Wu
Zhou Tai, (d. 223) military general of the state of Eastern Wu
Zhou Tong (archer), famous archer and teacher of Song Dynasty General Yue Fei
Zhou Yafu, Han dynasty general
Zhou Yu, (175–210) general of Eastern Wu

Fictional
Alphabetized by surname, then by given name.

Zhou Tong (Water Margin), fictional character from the Chinese classic the Water Margin
Zhou Botong, a fictional character from the Legend of the Condor Hero and Return of the Condor Heroes novels
Zhou Cang, fictional character from the Romance of the Three Kingdoms
Zhou Mei-Ling, fictional character from the Blizzard Entertainment video game Overwatch

See also
 Zhou clan of Runan

References

External links
 Chinese Zhou surname history

Chinese-language surnames
Individual Chinese surnames